The 1975 World Chess Championship was not played due to a dispute over the match format. Champion Bobby Fischer (United States) was to play Anatoly Karpov (Soviet Union) in Manila, commencing June 1, 1975. Fischer refused to play the then-standard "Best of 24 games" match and, after FIDE was unable to work out a compromise, forfeited his title instead. Karpov was named World Champion by default on April 3, 1975.

1973 Interzonal tournaments

Two 18-player, single round robin Interzonals were played with the top three from each qualifying for the Candidates Tournament. Leningrad and Petropolis, Brazil were the venues.

{| class="wikitable"
|+ June 1973 Interzonal, Leningrad
|-
!  !! !! Rating !! 1 !! 2 !! 3 !! 4 !! 5 !! 6 !! 7 !! 8 !! 9 !! 10 !! 11 !! 12 !! 13 !! 14 !! 15 !! 16 !! 17 !! 18 !! Total !! Tie break (not used)
|- style="background:#ccffcc;"
| 1-2 || align=left| || 2635 || - || ½ || 1 || ½ || 1 || 1 || ½ || 1 || ½ || 1 || 1 || 1 || ½ || 1 || 0 || 1 || 1 || 1 || 13½ || 108.25
|- style="background:#ccffcc;"
| 1-2 || align=left| || 2545 || ½ || - || ½ || 1 || ½ || ½ || 1 || ½ || 1 || ½ || 1 || ½ || 1 || 1 || 1 || 1 || 1 || 1 || 13½ || 104.25
|- style="background:#ccffcc;"
| 3 ||  || 2570 || 0 || ½ || - || ½ || ½ || 1 || ½ || ½ || ½ || 1 || 1 || 1 || ½ || 1 || 1 || 1 || 1 || 1 || 12½ || 
|-
| 4 || align=left| || 2570 || ½ || 0 || ½ || - || 0 || 0 || ½ || ½ || 1 || 1 || 0 || 1 || 1 || 1 || 1 || 1 || 1 || 1 || 11 || 
|-
| 5-6 || align=left| || 2600 || 0 || ½ || ½ || 1 || - || 0 || ½ || 1 || 1 || ½ || ½ || 1 || ½ || 1 || ½ || ½ || 0 || 1 || 10 || 79.50
|-
| 5-6 || align=left| || 2620 || 0 || ½ || 0 || 1 || 1 || - || 1 || 0 || 0 || ½ || 0 || 1 || 1 || ½ || 1 || ½ || 1 || 1 || 10 || 75.00
|-
| 7 || align=left| || 2565 || ½ || 0 || ½ || ½ || ½ || 0 || - || 1 || 0 || ½ || ½ || ½ || 1 || ½ || 1 || 1 || 1 || ½ || 9½ || 
|-
| 8-10 || align=left| || 2655 || 0 || ½ || ½ || ½ || 0 || 1 || 0 || - || 1 || ½ || 1 || 1 || ½ || 0 || 0 || 1 || 0 || 1 || 8½ || 67.25
|-
| 8-10 || align=left| || 2595 || ½ || 0 || ½ || 0 || 0 || 1 || 1 || 0 || - || ½ || ½ || ½ || ½ || 1 || ½ || 0 || 1 || 1 || 8½ || 64.00
|-
| 8-10 || align=left| || 2595 || 0 || ½ || 0 || 0 || ½ || ½ || ½ || ½ || ½ || - || ½ || 1 || ½ || ½ || 1 || ½ || 1 || ½ || 8½ || 63.00
|-
| 11-12 || align=left| || 2480 || 0 || 0 || 0 || 1 || ½ || 1 || ½ || 0 || ½ || ½ || - || 0 || 0 || ½ || ½ || 1 || ½ || 1 || 7½ || 55.75
|-
| 11-12 || align=left| || 2510 || 0 || ½ || 0 || 0 || 0 || 0 || ½ || 0 || ½ || 0 || 1 || - || 1 || 1 || ½ || ½ || 1 || 1 || 7½ || 49.50
|-
| 13-14 ||  || 2550 || ½ || 0 || ½ || 0 || ½ || 0 || 0 || ½ || ½ || ½ || 1 || 0 || - || ½ || ½ || ½ || ½ || 1 || 7 || 51.75
|-
| 13-14 ||  || 2430 || 0 || 0 || 0 || 0 || 0 || ½ || ½ || 1 || 0 || ½ || ½ || 0 || ½ || - || ½ || 1 || 1 || 1 || 7 || 45.00
|-
| 15 ||  || 2460 || 1 || 0 || 0 || 0 || ½ || 0 || 0 || 1 || ½ || 0 || ½ || ½ || ½ || ½ || - || 0 || 1 || ½ || 6½ || 
|-
| 16 ||  || 2560 || 0 || 0 || 0 || 0 || ½ || ½ || 0 || 0 || 1 || ½ || 0 || ½ || ½ || 0 || 1 || - || ½ || 1 || 6 || 
|-
| 17 ||  || 2385 || 0 || 0 || 0 || 0 || 1 || 0 || 0 || 1 || 0 || 0 || ½ || 0 || ½ || 0 || 0 || ½ || - || 1 || 4½ || 
|-
| 18 ||  || 2400 || 0 || 0 || 0 || 0 || 0 || 0 || ½ || 0 || 0 || ½ || 0 || 0 || 0 || 0 || ½ || 0 || 0 || - || 1½ || 
|}

Korchnoi, Karpov, and Byrne qualified for the Candidates Tournament.

{| class="wikitable"
|+ July–August 1973 Interzonal, Petropolis
|-
!  !! !! Rating !! 1 !! 2 !! 3 !! 4 !! 5 !! 6 !! 7 !! 8 !! 9 !! 10 !! 11 !! 12 !! 13 !! 14 !! 15 !! 16 !! 17 !! 18 !! Total !! Tie break (not used)
|- style="background:#ccffcc;"
| 1 || align=left| || 2575 || - || ½ || ½ || ½ || 1 || ½ || ½ || 1 || ½ || ½ || 1 || ½ || ½ || 1 || ½ || 1 || 1 || 1 || 12 || 
|-
| 2-4 || align=left| || 2585 || ½ || - || ½ || ½ || ½ || 1 || ½ || ½ || ½ || 1 || ½ || ½ || 1 || 1 || 0 || 1 || 1 || 1 || 11½ || 89.50
|- style="background:#ccffcc;"
| 2-4 ||  || 2640 || ½ || ½ || - || 1 || ½ || ½ || ½ || ½ || ½ || ½ || ½ || 0 || 1 || 1 || 1 || 1 || 1 || 1 || 11½ || 88.00
|- style="background:#ccffcc;"
| 2-4 || align=left| || 2645 || ½ || ½ || 0 || - || ½ || ½ || ½ || ½ || 1 || ½ || 1 || ½ || 1 || ½ || 1 || 1 || 1 || 1 || 11½ || 85.50
|-
| 5 || align=left| || 2600 || 0 || ½ || ½ || ½ || - || 0 || 1 || ½ || ½ || 1 || ½ || ½ || 1 || 1 || ½ || 1 || 1 || 1 || 11 || 
|-
| 6 || align=left| || 2585 || ½ || 0 || ½ || ½ || 1 || - || 0 || ½ || ½ || 1 || 1 || 1 || ½ || 1 || ½ || 1 || 1 || 0 || 10½ || 
|-
| 7 || align=left| || 2610 || ½ || ½ || ½ || ½ || 0 || 1 || - || 1 || 0 || 0 || 1 || ½ || ½ || ½ || 1 || ½ || 1 || 1 || 10 || 
|-
| 8 || align=left| || 2570 || 0 || ½ || ½ || ½ || ½ || ½ || 0 || - || ½ || 0 || 1 || 1 || ½ || ½ || 1 || 1 || ½ || 1 || 9½ || 
|-
| 9-10 || align=left| || 2535 || ½ || ½ || ½ || 0 || ½ || ½ || 1 || ½ || - || ½ || ½ || ½ || ½ || ½ || ½ || 1 || ½ || ½ || 9 || 72.75
|-
| 9-10 || align=left| || 2570 || ½ || 0 || ½ || ½ || 0 || 0 || 1 || 1 || ½ || - || 0 || 1 || ½ || 0 || 1 || ½ || 1 || 1 || 9 || 67.50
|-
| 11 || align=left| || 2575 || 0 || ½ || ½ || 0 || ½ || 0 || 0 || 0 || ½ || 1 || - || 1 || ½ || ½ || 1 || 1 || ½ || 1 || 8½ || 
|-
| 12-13 || align=left| || 2580 || ½ || ½ || 1 || ½ || ½ || 0 || ½ || 0 || ½ || 0 || 0 || - || ½ || ½ || ½ || ½ || 1 || 1 || 8 || 62.50
|-
| 12-13 ||  || 2605 || ½ || 0 || 0 || 0 || 0 || ½ || ½ || ½ || ½ || ½ || ½ || ½ || - || ½ || ½ || 1 || 1 || 1 || 8 || 54.25
|-
| 14 ||  || 2530 || 0 || 0 || 0 || ½ || 0 || 0 || ½ || ½ || ½ || 1 || ½ || ½ || ½ || - || 1 || ½ || ½ || 1 || 7½ || 
|-
| 15 ||  || 2395 || ½ || 1 || 0 || 0 || ½ || ½ || 0 || 0 || ½ || 0 || 0 || ½ || ½ || 0 || - || ½ || 1 || 1 || 6½ || 
|-
| 16-18 ||  || 2365 || 0 || 0 || 0 || 0 || 0 || 0 || ½ || 0 || 0 || ½ || 0 || ½ || 0 || ½ || ½ || - || ½ || 0 || 3 || 22.00
|-
| 16-18 ||  || 2445 || 0 || 0 || 0 || 0 || 0 || 0 || 0 || ½ || ½ || 0 || ½ || 0 || 0 || ½ || 0 || ½ || - || ½ || 3 || 20.25
|-
| 16-18 ||  || 2405 || 0 || 0 || 0 || 0 || 0 || 1 || 0 || 0 || ½ || 0 || 0 || 0 || 0 || 0 || 0 || 1 || ½ || - || 3 || 19.50
|}

Mecking qualified outright for the Candidates Tournament, while the three players tied for second place contested a playoff in Portorož for the remaining two spots.

{| class="wikitable"
|+ September 1973 playoff, Portoroz
|-
!  !! !! Rating !! 1 !! 2 !! 3 !! Total 
|- style="background:#ccffcc;"
| 1 || align=left| || 2650 || align=center|- || 11== || =1== || 5½
|- style="background:#ccffcc;"
| 2 || align=left| || 2625 || 00== || align=center|- || 110= || 3½
|-
| 3 ||  || 2605 || =0== || 001= || align=center|- || 3
|}

Portisch and Polugaevsky qualified.

1974 Candidates tournament

The 1974 Candidates Tournament was played as knockout matches. Spassky as the loser of the last championship match and Petrosian as loser of the previous candidates final were seeded directly into the tournament and joined by the top three from each of the two interzonals.

The first round matches were first to win three games, draws not counting. Semifinals were first to four wins, while the final was first to five wins but with a maximum of 24 games. Karpov beat Korchnoi 3–2 with 19 draws, earning the right to challenge Fischer.

The semifinal stage was marked by the presence of two ex-champions, Petrosian and Spassky, playing in different matches. The two had faced each other in the 1966 and 1969 title matches. Both were eliminated in this stage of the current cycle. Although the match rules called for four wins in the semifinals, Petrosian resigned the match after losing three games.

Candidates Final Match

Championship match
Fischer had, prior to his 1972 match against Spassky, felt that the first-to-12½-points format was not fair, since it encouraged whoever was leading to play for draws instead of wins. He himself exposed this strategy in the match: after having taken a comfortable lead, he drew games 14–20. With each game, he coasted closer to the title, while Spassky lost a chance to fight back. This style of chess offended Fischer. Instead he demanded the format be changed to that used in the very first World Championship, between Wilhelm Steinitz and Johannes Zukertort, where the winner was the first player to score 10 wins with draws not counting. In case of a 9–9 score, the champion would retain title, and the prize fund split equally. A FIDE Congress was held in 1974 during the Nice Olympiad. The delegates voted in favor of Fischer's 10-win proposal, but rejected the 9–9 clause as well as the possibility of an unlimited match. In response, Fischer refused to defend his title. Deadlines were extended for Fischer's reconsideration, but he did not respond, so Karpov was named World Champion by default on April 3, 1975.

Speculation of result
Because this was the only forfeited World Championship match in history, there has been much speculation on what would have been the result.

Garry Kasparov argued that Karpov would have had good chances, because he had beaten Spassky convincingly and was a new breed of tough professional, and indeed had higher-quality games, while Fischer had been inactive for three years. Spassky thought that Fischer would have won in 1975 but Karpov would have qualified again and beaten Fischer in 1978. According to Susan Polgar, commentators are divided, with a slight majority believing Fischer would have won, an opinion she shares.

In 2020, Karpov said, "I think I had chances. I can't say I had better chances [than Fischer] — I considered it would be a tough match."

Aftermath
Karpov had become world champion without defeating the previous champion in a match, causing some to question the legitimacy of his title. He combated these questions by participating in nearly every major tournament for the next ten years. He convincingly won the very strong Milan tournament in 1975, and captured his first of three Soviet titles in 1976. He created a phenomenal streak of tournament wins against the strongest players in the world. Karpov set a record of 9 consecutive tournament victories, until it was later broken by Garry Kasparov (14). As a result, most experts soon acknowledged him as a legitimate world champion.

Fischer did not play any competitive chess from 1973 to 1991. He re-emerged to play a match against Spassky in 1992, claiming he was still the World Champion. He then retired from chess permanently.

References

Further reading
 Anatoly Karpov: The Road to the World Chess Championship, Robert Byrne, Bantam Books, 1976
 Viktor Korchnoi: Chess is My Life, Viktor Korchnoi, Edition Olms, 2004

External links
 1973–75 Candidates Matches, Mark Weeks' Chess Pages

1975 in chess
1975
Cancelled sports events
Bobby Fischer